Multon is a surname. Notable people with the surname include:

Thomas de Multon, Baron, 1st Lord of Egremont
John de Multon, Baron, 2nd Lord of Egremont
Thomas de Multon, Lord of Multon, Judge, High Sheriff of Lincolnshire and Chief Justice of the Common Pleas
Thomas de Multon, Baron, 1st Lord of Gilsland
Margaret de Moulton, Baroness, 2nd Lady of Gillesland

See also
Moulton (disambiguation)